Richard Hollington Jr. is a former Republican member of the Ohio House of Representatives representing the 98th district.

Hollington is a lawyer and a partner in Baker & Hostetler LLP. He first served as a representative from 1967-70. In February 2010 incumbent representative Matt Dolan resigned in order to unsuccessfully seek an executive position in Cuyahoga County, and Hollington was named as his replacement until the election in November. State Senator Tim Grendell won the November election but decided to remain in the Senate instead of taking up the House seat, so Hollington was again appointed to represent the 98th district. Hollington resigned his position after being elected mayor of his village in November 2011.

References

Living people
Year of birth missing (living people)
21st-century American politicians
Republican Party members of the Ohio House of Representatives
People associated with BakerHostetler